The Green Bay Packers are a professional American football team based in Green Bay, Wisconsin. Since their founding in 1919, over 1,700 players, including 33 Pro Football Hall of Famers have played for the team. Of those 31, 6 players have had their uniform numbers officially retired by the organization. Professional sports franchises, including the Packers, retire uniform numbers to recognize the contributions that a player has made towards the team. It is customary that after the uniform number is retired, it is no longer worn by future players with that team. These uniform numbers are usually prominently displayed within the team's arena or stadium. In the case of the Packers, the retired numbers are displayed above the box seats in the north end zone of Lambeau Field.

Packers history
The first Green Bay Packer to have his number retired was Don Hutson ( 14) in 1951. Hutson played wide receiver for the Packers for 11 seasons where he set multiple National Football League (NFL) records and was named NFL Most Valuable Player (MVP) in 1941 and 1942. His number was retired by coach Gene Ronzani during a brief ceremony at halftime of a game against the New York Yanks. In 1952, Tony Canadeo became the second Packer to have his number ( 3) retired, immediately after he retired from the NFL. Canadeo played offense, defense, and special teams for 11 seasons for the Packers, becoming the first Packer to rush for over 1,000 yards and winning the NFL championship in 1944. It is not known whether there was a ceremony recognizing the number retirement, however at the very least an unofficial recognition occurred in 1952.

The third Packer to have his number retired was quarterback Bart Starr ( 15). Over 16 seasons, Starr led the Packers to five NFL Championships, including the first two Super Bowls in 1966 and 1967. He was named Super Bowl MVP in both games and was the NFL MVP for the 1966 season. He may be most famous for his winning touchdown dive in the closing seconds of the 1967 NFL Championship Game, which became known as the "Ice Bowl". His number was retired during a ceremony at halftime of a game against the St. Louis Cardinals in 1973, two years after his career was over. Linebacker Ray Nitschke became the fourth Packer to have his number retired ( 66) in 1983. Nitschke was a five-time NFL Champion and two-time Super Bowl winner under coach Vince Lombardi and anchored the Packers defense for 15 seasons. Nitschke's number was retired in 1983 in a small ceremony at a game against the Chicago Bears.

Reggie White's  92 was the fifth number to be retired by the Packers. White, who was known as the "Minister of Defense", came to the Packers as one of the first big signings of the newly revised NFL free agency rules in 1993 and played for the team for six seasons. As a Packer, he was a Super Bowl champion in 1996, a two-time first-team All-Pro and was named the NFL Defensive Player of the Year in 1998. His number was retired during a half-time ceremony in 2005, less than a year after his death from cardiac and pulmonary sarcoidosis in September 2004. He was the first and only Packer to have his number retired posthumously, and the first NFL player to have his number retired by two teams (the other being the Philadelphia Eagles). Quarterback Brett Favre, White's teammate for six seasons, became the sixth and most recent Packer to have his number ( 4) retired. Favre played for the Packers for 16 seasons, starting a record 253 consecutive games at quarterback between 1992 and 2007 (a record that was extended to 297 games after his tenure with the Packers). Favre was 3-time NFL MVP, an 11-time Pro Bowl selection, and part of the NFL 1990s All-Decade Team. He led the Packers to their first championship games since the 1960s in Super Bowl XXXI and Super Bowl XXXII, winning the first and losing the second. His number was retired in 2015 at half-time during a game against the Chicago Bears.

Retired numbers

Future additions

Founder, coach, and player Curly Lambeau is the only Packer credited with wearing jersey  1, although it has never been formally retired. The Packers have recognized Lambeau in a more significant manner than just a number retirement by naming their current stadium Lambeau Field shortly after he died.

Paul Hornung's  5 was unofficially retired at the Packers' annual press party on July 10, 1967, although there has not been a ceremony to put his number on the wall of retired numbers at Lambeau Field. The number retirement never became official for a couple of reasons. First, Vince Lombardi, who initiated the number retirement, left the organization less than seven months after the announcement and died a year later. Second, number retirements were not as well known or publicized back in the 1960s. Hornung's  5 has only been issued to four players since his retirement, and none since 1988. All of the players to wear the  5 after Hornung only played a few games for the Packers before leaving the team or changing uniform number.

The  12 has also been identified as a potential number to retire to honor the contributions of current Packers quarterback Aaron Rodgers. Rodgers led the Packers to a victory in Super Bowl XLV, was named NFL MVP four times in 2011, 2014, 2020 and 2021 and has been one of the most successful quarterbacks in NFL history.

Notes

References

 
Retired Numbers
Green Bay Packers